Black Moon is a 1975 experimental fantasy horror film directed by Louis Malle and starring Cathryn Harrison, Joe Dallesandro, Therese Giehse and Alexandra Stewart. It was shown at the 1975 New York Film Festival and was distributed in the United States by 20th Century Fox. Though the film was created in France, its dialogue is in English. The film is dedicated to Giehse, who died shortly after shooting had completed.

Plot
Lily is attempting to seek refuge amidst an apparent gender-based civil war in which men and women are systematically killing one another. On a rural road, she encounters men executing women by firing squad, and flees with her car into the woods, following an overgrown road. There, she encounters a flock of sheep gathered around their shepherd, who has hanged himself from a tree. She later comes across a group of women donning military gear and torturing a young man. She abandons her car, fleeing on foot, and falls asleep in a meadow, where she hears the flowers beneath her crying in pain. Moments later, she witnesses a brown unicorn pass by, followed by a woman on a horse, and a number of naked children who begin herding a pig.

Lily trails the man to an apparently abandoned château located beyond overgrowth on a hill. While exploring the house, she finds it fully furnished, but inhabited by numerous animals. Upstairs, she finds an elderly bedridden woman chastising her pet rat, Humphrey. The woman proceeds to attack Lily before contacting an unknown person on a transistor radio, making cruel observations of Lily's appearance and revealing details of how Lily arrived there that she should have no way of knowing. A number of alarm clocks inexplicably go off, and the old woman tries to strangle Lily. When Lily slaps her, the woman dies.

Outside, Lily's attention is diverted by a man singing in the garden. Via telepathy, he communicates to her that his name is also Lily. His sister, also named Lily whom Lily had mistaken for a man earlier, arrives on horseback. Lily attempts to explain to Brother and Sister Lily that their mother is dead, but they are impervious and refuse to speak to her. When she follows them upstairs, she witnesses the old woman return to life before Sister Lily breastfeeds her.

Brother and Sister lock Lily in the room with the old woman, sending Lily into a rage. While exploring the room, she eats a piece of cheese and looks through a photo album containing pictures of the old woman, whilst the old woman continues to make observations about her to the unknown person on the radio. To the old woman's anger, Lily looks out the window and again sees the unicorn. Lily climbs out the window and down the wall, and chases the unicorn around the sprawling property as it continuously eludes her. She is horrified when she stumbles upon the corpse of a female soldier. Brother picks the corpse up and buries it in a grave. The unicorn appears again, and Lily chases it until she trips over the pig and is set upon by the band of nude children. The unicorn once again appears to Lily, and tells her she is mean. The unicorn also tells Lily the old woman upstairs is not real.

In the house, Lily observes Sister serving the children dinner. Upstairs, Lily tries to comfort the old woman after another fight with Humphrey, and agrees to breastfeed her. Later, Lily plays Tristan und Isolde on the parlor piano. The children sing along, while Sister paints Brother's face and the two reenact the opera. At dawn, Lily finds the old woman has disappeared. A hawk flies into the house, which Brother decapitates with a sword. Brother and Sister then battle one another in the garden as Lily watches from the window. Brother beats Sister with a stick, and Sister bashes him in the face with a rock as sounds of gunfire emanate from the woods. Lily climbs into the old woman's empty bed and tries unsuccessfully to use the radio, after which a snake slithers onto the bed. Outside, a large crowd of sheep and turkeys surround the house. After falling asleep, Lily awakens to find the unicorn seated in front of the fireplace. Lily prepares to breastfeed the unicorn.

Production

Malle has characterized his film as "[o]paque, sometimes clumsy, it is the most intimate of my films. I see it as a strange voyage to the limits of the medium, or maybe my own limits."

Black Moon was shot in Malle's own 200-year-old manor house and its surrounding  estate in the lush, wild Dordogne valley in Quercy, near Cahors, called "Le Coual," or "The Crow's Call." The house and grounds were actually the initial inspiration for the film, according to Malle in an interview in Cinefantastique (Volume 5, Number 1): "It began with the fact that I wanted to shoot the film in my own house. Black Moon certainly comes very much from the place where I live, the kind of countryside around the house. There's something very ancient, maybe archaic, about it, also something...hostile." Malle also said that the film was influenced by his admiration for Lewis Carroll's Alice in Wonderland.

Malle hired Sven Nykvist, Ingmar Bergman's cinematographer, to shoot the film, and wanted there to be no scenes in which there was direct sunlight. They shot indoor scenes on sunny days until the light was right for the exterior shots.

Thinking that the film would be difficult for audiences to sit through as a full-length feature, Malle considered releasing it in a shorter version, and prepared a one-hour cut, removing scenes that he felt did not work.

Release

Home media
A digitally restored version of the film was released by The Criterion Collection in June 2011.

Critical response
Vincent Canby of The New York Times praised the film's cinematography, performances, and imagery, calling the film "baffling and beautiful and occasionally very funny." Time Out wrote, "Malle offers no explanation for his heroine's visionary odyssey through a world in which all history runs parallel with all realities. Yet a logic is there, even if its reference point is jabberwocky." Dennis Schwartz from Ozus' World Movie Reviews awarded the film an A− rating, praising the film's cinematography and themes, calling it "an hysterical but absorbing Alice-in-Wonderland surrealist fantasy film." TV Guide gave the film a positive review, calling it "'[a] haunting, disturbing picture that is half-fantasy, half-reality, but we are never certain which is which." Joseph Jon Lanthier of Slant Magazine rated the film three out of five stars, concluding, "Suckling as it does from the budding teat of preadolescent sexuality, it’s not surprising that Black Moon is a tad Malle-nourished."

Awards and nominations
Black Moon won French César Awards for Best Sound and Best Cinematography.

References

Sources

External links 
 
 
 
 Black Moon at TCM
Black Moon: Louis in Wonderland an essay by Ginette Vincendeau at the Criterion Collection

1975 films
1970s avant-garde and experimental films
1970s fantasy films
1975 horror films
French avant-garde and experimental films
French fantasy films
Films about telepathy
Films about unicorns
Films directed by Louis Malle
Films set in country houses
German avant-garde and experimental films
West German films
English-language French films
English-language German films
1970s English-language films
1970s French films
1970s German films